Heinrich Helferich (4 May 1851 in Tübingen – 18 December 1945 in Eisenach) was a German surgeon. He was the father of chemist Burckhardt Helferich (1887–1982).

He studied medicine at the universities of Munich and Leipzig, receiving his doctorate at Munich in 1874. Following graduation, he worked as an assistant to Christian Wilhelm Braune and Karl Thiersch at the University of Leipzig, obtaining his habilitation for surgery in 1877. In 1879 he returned to Munich as director of the university surgical polyclinic. In 1884 he became an associate professor, and during the following year, relocated to the University of Greifswald as a full professor and director of the surgical clinic. In 1899 he succeeded Friedrich von Esmarch as chair of surgery at the University of Kiel.

Principal works
 Die antiseptische Wundbehandlung in ihren Erfolgen und Wirkungen, 1892 – Antiseptic wound treatment, results and actions. 
 Atlas und Grundriss der traumatischen Frakturen und Luxationen (7th edition, 1906). Translated into English as Atlas and epitome of traumatic fractures and dislocations, (1902).

References

1851 births
1945 deaths
People from Tübingen
Academic staff of the University of Kiel
Academic staff of the University of Greifswald
Academic staff of the Ludwig Maximilian University of Munich
German surgeons